A reverse dictionary is a dictionary alphabetized by the reversal of each entry:
kcots (stock)
kcotseid (diestock)
kcotser (restock)
kcotsevil (livestock)

Before computers, reverse dictionaries were tedious to produce. The first computer-produced was Stahl and Scavnicky's A Reverse Dictionary of the Spanish Language, in 1974.

Definition
In a reverse word dictionary, the entries are alphabetized by the last letter first, then next to last, and so on. In them, words with the same suffix appear together. This can be useful for linguists and poets looking for words ending with a particular suffix, or by an epigrapher or forensics specialist examining a damaged text (e.g. a stone inscription, or a burned document) that had only the final portion of a word. Reverse dictionaries of this type have been published for most major alphabetical languages.

Applications
Applications of reverse word dictionaries include:
 Simple rhyming dictionaries, to the extent that spelling predicts pronunciation.
 Finding words with a given suffix (i.e., meaningful ending), like -ment.
 Finding words with the same ending as a given word, even if the sequence is not meaningful.
 Setting or solving word puzzles, such as -gry or the earlier -dous puzzle (find words ending in some way), or crossword puzzles.

Construction
Reverse word dictionaries are straightforward to construct, by simply sorting based on reversed words. This was labor-intensive and tedious before computers, but is now straightforward. By the same token, reverse dictionaries have become less important since online word lists can be searched dynamically.

Examples

English

Online 
 closedtags.com

Physical 
 Normal and Reverse Word List. Compiled under the direction of A. F. Brown at the University of Pennsylvania, under a contract with the Air Force Office of Scientific Research (AF 49 [638]-1042) Department of Linguistics, Philadelphia, 1963.
 Lehnert, Martin, Rückläufiges Wörterbuch der englischen Gegenwartssprache, VEB Verlag Enzyklopädie, Leipzig, 1971. 
 McGovern, Una, Chambers back-words for crosswords: a reverse-sorted list, Chambers, Edinburgh, 2002
 Muthmann, Gustav, Reverse English dictionary: based on phonological and morphological principles, Mouton de Gruyter, New York, 1999.
 Walker, John, The rhyming dictionary of the English language: in which the whole language is arranged according to its terminations, Routledge & Kegan Paul, London, 1983.

Other Languages

Akkadian
 Hecker, Karl, Rückläufiges Wörterbuch des Akkadischen, Harrassowitz, Wiesbaden, 1990.

Albanian
 Snoj, Marko, Rückläufiges Wörterbuch der albanischen Sprache, Buske Verlag, Hamburg, 1994.

Czech
 Těšitelová, Marie; Petr, Jan; Králík, Jan. Retrográdní slovník současné češtiny, Praha, Academia, 1986.

Dutch
 Nieuwborg, E.R., Retrograde woordenboek van de Nederlandse taal, Kluwer Technische Boeken, Deventer, 1978.

Estonian
 Hinderling, Robert, Rückläufiges estnisches Wörterbuch = Eesti keele pöördsõnaraamat (Sõnalõpuline leksikon) = Reverse dictionary of the Estonian language, Sprach- und Literaturwissenschaftliche Fakultät der Universität Bayreuth, Bayreuth, 1979.

Finnish
 Tuomi, Tuomo (ed.), Suomen kielen käänteissanakirja – Reverse Dictionary of Modern Standard Finnish, Suomalaisen kirjallisuuden seura, 1980. .

French
 Juilland, A., Dictionnaire inverse de la langue française, Mouton, The Hague, 1965.

German
 Bruckner, T., Rückläufige Wortliste zum heutigen Deutsch, Institut für Deutsche Sprache, Mannheim, 1986.
 Mater, Erich, Rückläufiges Wörterbuch der deutschen Gegenwartssprache CD-ROM, Straelener Ms.-Verlag, Straelen, 2001 
 Muthmann, Gustav, Rückläufiges deutsches Wörterbuch: Handbuch der Wortausgänge im Deutschen, mit Beachtung der Wort- und Lautstruktur, Niemeyer, Tübingen, 2001.

Cypriot-Greek
 Συμεωνίδης, Χ. Π., Αντίστροφο λεξικό της κυπριακής διαλέκτου. Ετυμολογικό λεξικό της κυπριακής διαλέκτου. Πρώτο μέρος. Τα δυσπρόσιτα της κυπριακής διαλέκτου, 2017

Greek, modern
 Αναστασιάδη-Συμεωνίδη, Α. Αντίστροφο Λεξικό της Νέας Ελληνικής. Θεσσαλονίκη: Ινστιτούτο Νεοελληνικών Σπουδών, 2002.
 Κουρμούλης Γ. Αντίστροφον λεξικόν της Νέας Ελληνικής. Δεύτερη Έκδοση. Αθήνα: Παπαδήμας, 2002.
 Τσιλογιάννης, Παύλος,  Αντίστροφο λεξικό της νέας - αρχαίας Ελληνικής γλώσσας : με διάγραμμα ιστορίας της Ελληνικής γλώσσας και χρήσιμους πίνακες, 2000 (modern and ancient Greek)
 Μπαλαφούτης, Ευάγγελος, Αντίστροφο λεξικό της κοινής νεοελληνικής γλώσσας, 1996

Hebrew
 Kuhn, Karl Georg, Rückläufiges hebräisches Wörterbuch, Vandenhoeck & Ruprecht, Göttingen, 1958

Hebrew and Aramaic
 Sander, Ruth and Kerstin Mayerhofer, Retrograde Hebrew and Aramaic dictionary, Vandenhoeck & Ruprecht, Göttingen, 2010.

Hungarian
 Papp, Ferenc, A magyar nyelv szóvégmutató szótára [Reverse-alphabetized dictionary of the Hungarian language]. Akadémiai Kiadó, Budapest, 1969, 2nd ed.: 1994.

Indian, old
 Schwarz, Wolfgang, Rückläufiges Wörterbuch des Altindischen = Reverse index of old Indian, Harrassowitz, Wiesbaden, 1974-1978.

Italian
 Alinei, M.L., Dizionario inverso italiano, con indici e liste di frequenza delle terminazioni, Mouton & Co., The Hague 1965.

Latin
 Gradenwitz, Otto, [https://archive.org/details/laterculivocuml00gradgoog Laterculi vocum latinarum], Leipzig : S. Hirzel, 1904.

Macedonian
 Mitrevski, George, Macedonian Reverse Dictionary = Македонски обратен речник. https://www.pelister.org/linguistics/revdict/index.html

Manchu
 Rozycki, William, A reverse index of Manchu, Research Institute for Inner Asian Studies, Indiana University, Bloomington, 1981.

Mongolian
 Krueger, John Richard, Mongolian epigraphical dictionary in reverse listing, Indiana University, Bloomington, 1967.
 Vietze, Hans Peter, Rückläufiges Wörterbuch der mongolischen Sprache, Verlag Enzyklopädie, Leipzig, 1976.

Russian
 Reverse Russian Wiktionary
 Bielfeldt, H.H., Rückläufiges Wörterbuch der Russischen Sprache der Gegenwart, Akademie Verlag, Berlin, 1958.

Serbo-Croatian
 Matešić, Josip, Rückläufiges Wörterbuch des Serbokroatischen, Otto Harrassowitz, Wiesbaden, 1965–1967.

Slovak
 Garabík, Radovan et al., Retrográdny slovník súčasnej slovenčiny – slovné tvary na báze Slovenského národného korpusu, VEDA, vydavateľstvo SAV, Bratislava, 2018. . 
 Mistrík, Jozef, Retrográdny slovník slovenčiny, Univerzita Komenského, Bratislava, 1976. 735 pp.

Slovene
 Hajnšek-Holz, Milena and Primož Jakopin, Odzadnji slovar slovenskega jezika po Slovarju slovenskega knjižnega jezika, ZRC SAZU, Ljubljana, 1996.

Spanish
 Bosque, I., Pérez, M., Diccionario inverso de la lengua española, Gredos, Madrid, 1987.
 Stahl, Fred A., Scavnicky, Gary E. A., A Reverse Dictionary of the Spanish Language, University of Illinois Press, Urbana, IL, 1974.

Turkish
 Kubiyak, Yel, Rückläufiges Wörterbuch des Türkischen, Landeck, Frankfurt, 2004.

Welsh
 Zimmer, Stefan, A reverse dictionary of modern Welsh = Geiriadur gwrthdroadol Cymraeg diweddar, Buske, Hamburg, 1987.

See also
 Reverse index

References 

Dictionaries by type